Hibbertia malacophylla is a species of flowering plant in the family Dilleniaceae and is endemic to Queensland. It is a spreading shrub with densely hairy foliage, elliptic leaves, and single yellow flowers arranged in leaf axils with 50 to 55 stamens arranged around the two carpels.

Description
Flowering occurs from February to August.

Taxonomy
Hibbertia malacophylla was first formally described in 2010 by Hellmut R. Toelken in the Journal of the Adelaide Botanic Gardens from specimens collected near Port Curtis in 1977. The specific epithet (malacophylla) means "soft-leaved", referring to densely silky-hairy leaves.

Distribution and habitat
This hibbertia grows on granite outcrops in forest on the Many Peaks Range near Gladstone.

Conservation status
Hibbertia malacophylla is classified as "least concern" under the Queensland Government Nature Conservation Act 1992.

See also
List of Hibbertia species

References

malacophylla
Flora of Queensland
Plants described in 2010
Taxa named by Hellmut R. Toelken